Pistamata is a hill village in northern Monemvasia municipality, Laconia, Greece. The village is located on a small peninsula off the east coast of the Peloponnese on the road between the villages of Charakas and Lampokampos. Before the governmental reorganization of 2011, Pistamata was in the Zarakas municipality, and it remains in the Zarakas subunit.

The people of Pistamata, like many of the surrounding villages, are Arvanites, that is, of Albanian descent, although they have been hellenized.

On 30 August 1926, Pistamata suffered a magnitude 7.1 earthquake.

Notes

External links
 

Populated places in Laconia
Monemvasia